The 1957 Hamilton Tiger-Cats finished in 1st place in the East Division with a 10–4 record and won the Grey Cup over the Winnipeg Blue Bombers. The Tiger-Cats played the Kitchener-Waterloo Dutchmen in the preseason, which would prove to be the last time they would play an Ontario Rugby Football Union team.

Preseason

Regular season

Season Standings

Season schedule

Playoffs

Schedule

Grey Cup

References

Hamilton Tiger-cats Season, 1957
Hamilton Tiger-Cats seasons
James S. Dixon Trophy championship seasons
Grey Cup championship seasons
Hamilton Tiger-Cats